The  was a cabinet-level government ministry of the Empire of Japan from 1929 to 1942.

History

The original Ministry of Colonial Affairs was the short-lived Hokkaidō Colonization Office, established in the early Meiji period by Prime Minister Kuroda Kiyotaka to protect Japan's sparely populated northern frontier against encroachment by the Russian Empire by encouraging the settlement of ex-soldiers as militia-farmers in Hokkaidō. 

This was followed by the even shorter-lived Colonial Administration Department within the office of the Governor-General of Taiwan. Established on 2 April 1896 by General Takashima Tomonosuke, it was intended to encourage Japanese investment and settlement in Taiwan, after the acquisition of that island by Japan as a result of the First Sino-Japanese War. The office was abolished on 2 September 1897.

The bureau came under much criticism for its ineffectiveness, and on 10 June 1929, it was elevated into a separate cabinet-level ministry under Prime Minister Giichi Tanaka.

However, the ministry did not actually sponsor emigration to those territories. It only provided advice and cooperated with private emigration sponsorship companies.

The ministry also oversaw operations of the South Manchuria Railway Company, but its authority did not extend to Manchuria due to strong resistance by the Ministry of War, who wanted to keep control over the future economic development of Manchuria to itself.

Likewise, the Governor-General of Korea, who was accustomed to virtual autonomy, rejected the new ministry's control and continued to administer Korea with little interference.

On 1 November 1942, the Ministry of Colonial Affairs was abolished, and its functions divided between the Japanese Foreign Ministry and the newly created Ministry of Greater East Asia.

List of Ministers of Colonial Affairs

Bibliography

Japan
Colonial Affairs
Japanese colonial empire
Foreign relations of the Empire of Japan
Politics of the Empire of Japan
1923 establishments in Japan
1942 disestablishments in Japan
Colonial Affairs, Japan
Colonial Affairs, Japan
1923 establishments in the Japanese colonial empire
1942 disestablishments in the Japanese colonial empire